The 1960 Scotch Cup was the second edition of what would later be the men's World Curling Championship. It was hosted in Ayr, Edinburgh and Glasgow, Scotland with Canada and Scotland being the two teams to compete in the competition. In the five game series it was Canada who defeated Scotland 5-0.

Teams

Standings

Results

Draw 1
March 18, Ayr

Draw 2
March 21, Edinburgh

Draw 3
March 22, Glasgow

Draw 4
March 23, Glasgow

Draw 5
March 23, Glasgow

References

World Men's Curling Championship
Scotch Cup, 1960
Scotch Cup, 1960
International curling competitions hosted by Scotland
International sports competitions in Glasgow
Sport in Ayr
International sports competitions in Edinburgh
1960s in Glasgow
1960s in Edinburgh
March 1960 sports events in the United Kingdom